
Gmina Krotoszyce is a rural gmina (administrative district) in Legnica County, Lower Silesian Voivodeship, in south-western Poland.

Neighbouring gminas
Gmina Krotoszyce is bordered by the town of Legnica and the gminas of Legnickie Pole, Męcinka, Miłkowice and Złotoryja.

Villages
The gmina contains the villages of Babin, Czerwony Kościół, Dunino, Janowice Duże, Kościelec, Kozice, Krajów, Krotoszyce, Prostynia, Szymanowice, Tyńczyk Legnicki, Warmątowice Sienkiewiczowskie, Wilczyce, Winnica and Złotniki.

Twin towns – sister cities

Gmina Krotoszyce is twinned with:
 Markersdorf, Germany
 Osečná, Czech Republic

References

Krotoszyce
Legnica County